Shipai Town may refer to:

Shipai, Dongguan, Guangdong
Shipai Town, Anhui